Eva Prawitz Faber (born 30 September 1920) is a German former pair skater and ice dancer. With partner Otto Weiß, she finished eighth at the 1936 Winter Olympics and won the gold medal at the German Figure Skating Championships in 1937. Prawitz later married fellow skater Horst Faber, and together they won the ice dancing championship at the 1950 German Nationals.

References

External links
 

1920 births
Possibly living people
German female pair skaters
German female ice dancers
Olympic figure skaters of Germany
Figure skaters at the 1936 Winter Olympics
20th-century German dancers
20th-century German women